The tule perch Hysterocarpus traskii is a surfperch (Embiotocidae) native to the rivers and estuaries of central California, United States of America. It is the sole member of its genus, and the only freshwater surfperch.

The tule perch is small, at most  in length, and deep-bodied, with a definite hump shape between the head and the dorsal fin. Color is variable, with a dark back that may have a bluish or purplish cast, and a whitish or yellowish belly. The sides may have a pattern of narrow or wide bars; the frequency of barred patterns varies according to subspecies. The dorsal fin has a noticeable ridge of scales running along its base, and consists of 15-19 spines followed by 9-15 soft rays. The anal fin has three spines and 20-16 soft rays, while the pectoral fins have 17-19 rays.

They are fish of the lowlands, inhabiting lakes, sloughs, streams, and rivers, generally in areas with beds of vegetation or overhangs. They generally gather in groups, sometimes in large numbers. Their diet is primarily small invertebrates sucked up from the bottom or picked from the midwater column.

The two subspecies of tule perch recognized by FishBase are:

 Hysterocarpus traskii traskii Gibbons, 1854, the Russian River tule perch, originally occurred throughout Clear Lake, the Russian River, the Sacramento River-San Joaquin River and out into the estuaries around San Francisco Bay and the Pajaro River-Salinas River drainages.  It is still common as far north as the Pit River, although it has mostly disappeared from the San Joaquin basin. The only unbarred fish occur in this subspecies, about 43% existing in this color pattern.
 Hysterocarpus traskii pomo Hopkirk, 1974 is found in the Central Valley drainages.

The formal description of the tule perch was first read by W. P. Gibbons at a meeting of the California Academy of Natural Sciences on May 15, 1854, and then published in the San Francisco newspaper The Daily Placer Times and Transcript on May 18, making it a rare case of a new species being published in a newspaper rather than book or scientific journal. Gibbons chose the genus name Hysterocarpus "womb-fruit" referring to the livebearing common to all surfperches. The specific name honours John B. Trask (1824-1879), who was a friend of William P. Gibbons and was a physician and amateur geologist, he was also a  founding member of the California Academy of Sciences.

References

 
 Peter B. Moyle, Inland Fishes of California (University of California Press, 2002), pp. 424–428
 
  University of California, Division of Agriculture and Natural Resources; California Fish Website; California Fish Species

Embiotocidae
Endemic fauna of California
Fish of the Western United States
Monotypic fish genera
Sacramento River
Salinas River (California)
San Francisco Bay
San Joaquin River
Fish described in 1854